"Can't Say" (stylized in all caps) is a song by American rapper Travis Scott from his third studio album Astroworld (2018). It features additional vocals from American rapper Don Toliver, and was produced by WondaGurl and London Cyr. The track samples "25 Lighters" by DJ DMD featuring Fat Pat and Lil' Keke. In the song, Scott and Toliver sing about taking drugs and seducing women.

Critical reception
Kiana Fitzgerald gave the song a positive review in a Complex article, praising the switching of beats as well as the sample. She wrote, "Alongside Scott's Auto-Tune'd crooning and Fat Pat's deepened voice, Toliver's vocals stand out, thin and vibrant, like an oboe letting loose in a solo."

Music video
The music video was released on February 5, 2019. Directed by Nathalie Canguilhem and produced by Yves Saint Laurent, it features a purple hue and CGI. In the video, Travis Scott leads a group of dirt bike riders, all dressed in Saint Laurent suits and pulling stunts on a futuristic highway. Scott stands on a moving motorcycle while the cyclists behind him "pop wheelies". In one scene, a nude woman is crucified on a neon-lit cross with speakers. At another point in the video, a herd of horses run through an empty tunnel while clones of Travis Scott ride in glowing go-karts.

Charts

Certifications

References

2018 songs
Travis Scott songs
Songs written by Travis Scott
Songs written by WondaGurl
Songs written by Frank Dukes
Songs written by Mike Dean (record producer)
Songs written by Sonny Digital
Don Toliver songs
Songs written by Don Toliver